Antirrhinum coulterianum (syn. Sairocarpus coulterianus) is a species of New World snapdragon known by the common name Coulter's snapdragon.

Distribution
It is native to southern California and Baja California, where it grows in desert shrublands and in the coastal hills and mountains, especially in areas that have recently burned.

Description
Antirrhinum coulterianum is an annual herb producing an erect stem which often clings to objects or other plants for support. It is mostly hairless, except for the inflorescence at the top, which can be quite woolly.

Leaves are sparse and generally linear and there is often a basal rosette of leaves at the base of the stem; this is the only Antirrhinum that forms such a rosette.

The top of the mostly naked stem is occupied by a raceme inflorescence of white snapdragon flowers, which are often tinted with lavender or pink, especially when newly opened. Each flower is about a centimeter wide.

References

External links

Jepson Manual Treatment: Antirrhinum coulterianum
USDA Plants Profile
Antirrhinum coulterianum — U.C. Photo gallery

coulterianum
Flora of California
Flora of Baja California
Flora of the California desert regions
Natural history of the California chaparral and woodlands
Natural history of the Mojave Desert
Natural history of the Peninsular Ranges
Natural history of the Transverse Ranges
Flora without expected TNC conservation status